Pusako Anak Nagari Airport is a domestic airport that serves flights from and to Simpang Ampek. The airport is located in Jorong Laban, Nagari Kapa, Luhak nan Duo, West Pasaman, West Sumatra, Indonesia. The type of aircraft can land at the airport is Casa 212.

Airlines and destinations

Statistics

See also
 Minangkabau International Airport
 Rokot Airport

References

External links
  Bandara Pusako Anak Nagari Peroleh Anggaran Rp4,4 Miliar
  Bandara Pusako Anak Nagari ditargetkan beroperasi 2014
  Kepala Otoritas Bandara Tinjau Pembangunan Bandara Pusako
  Fasilitas Bandara Laban Terus Dilengkapi
  Kado Akhir Tahun, Pasaman Barat Miliki Bandar Udara
  SOCIETY HUT ke-8 Kabupaten Pasaman Barat
  Bandara Laban Layani Rute BIM dan Pekanbaru

Airports in Sumatra
Buildings and structures in West Sumatra
Transport in West Sumatra
Airports established in 2005